Stenidea genei is a species of beetle in the family Cerambycidae. It was described by Aragona in 1830, originally under the genus Saperda. It is known from Corsica, Austria, Spain, Bosnia and Herzegovina, Slovakia, Croatia, Hungary, Serbia, Cyprus, Israel, Switzerland, France, Germany (where its population is considered extinct), the Czech Republic, Albania, Iran, Bulgaria, Italy, Romania, Montenegro, Slovenia, and Ukraine.

Subspecies
 Stenidea genei genei (Aragona, 1830)
 Stenidea genei naviauxi Villiers, 1970

References

genei
Beetles described in 1830